Marysieńka may refer to:

 Marysieńka (queen), short name of Marie Casimire Louise de La Grange d'Arquien, queen of Poland
 Marysieńka, Opole Voivodeship, a Polish village